Martin McKay (5 June 1937 – 14 June 2007) was an Irish cyclist. He competed in the sprint at the 1960 Summer Olympics.

References

External links
 

1937 births
2007 deaths
Irish male cyclists
Olympic cyclists of Ireland
Cyclists at the 1960 Summer Olympics
Sportspeople from Belfast